Fritz Bøchen Vikke (14 February 1884 – 23 August 1955) was a Danish athlete. He competed in the men's pole vault at the 1912 Summer Olympics.

References

1884 births
1955 deaths
Athletes (track and field) at the 1912 Summer Olympics
Danish male pole vaulters
Olympic athletes of Denmark
Place of birth missing